Fudbalski klub Tekstilac Derventa is a professional association football club from the town of Derventa, Republika Srpska that is situated in Bosnia and Herzegovina.

Tekstilac currently plays in the First League of the Republika Srpska and plays its home matches on the Derventa City Stadium which has a capacity of 1,500 seats.

History

The first football club in Derventa before World War II was FK Dečko which was formed before FK Tekstilac. After World War II FK Dečko merged into FK Tekstilac Derventa.

In the long and rich history of FK Tekstilac Derventa, the teams which played between 1960 and 1968 will be remembered as one of the most talented and the best. The creator and leader of this brilliant team was the legendary attacker Faruk Tarabar. He had plenty football experience and excellent pedagogical skills. He managed to compose the talent and skill of that excellent Tekstilac generation.

Those teams brought many of their fans to the stadium to cheer for FK Tekstilac. Fans came to games in big numbers and players of Tekstilac gave them unforgettable times in that period.

The start of the series in 1966/67 was memorable because Tekstilac, in the first three matches, beat first team of FK Radnik Bijeljina with 5:0, then in next game they did the same thing to team of NK Zvijezda Gradačac (also they beat them 5:0), and in third match Tekstilac beat FK Budućnost Banovići in Banovići with 5:1.

Unfortunately, many of the players and member of the board of directors are not alive today, like Nikica Sirovina, Faruk Tarabar, Haso Kapetanović, Kemal "Spazo" Buzadžić, Nezir "Benco" Crnčević. Many of them also were refugees from Derventa: Ramo Slomić, Alija Vejzović and Mesud Jegić who all live in Sweden today. Emin Nakić and Pavek are in United States, Zvonko Bošnjak, Suljko and others are in Germany.

From other generations there was Branko Janković as a multi-talented player of both Handball (RK Derventa) and football (Tekstilac).

Players

Current squad

Coaching staff

Historical list of managers
 Faruk Tarabar
 Damir Porobić
 Radivoje "Rade" Vasiljević (Season 2000–2001)
 Predrag Drinić
 Edin "Dino" Porobić (Season 2009–2010)
  Slobodan Kovačević
 Mitar Lukić (2012–2014)
 Bojan Magazin (2014–2017)
 Zoran Dragišić (2017)
 Marko Stojić (2017–2018)
 Danimir Milkanović (2019–2020)
 Čedomir Ćulum (2020)
 Mile Lazarević (2020–present)

References

External links
FK Tekstilac Derventa at FSRS

Football clubs in Bosnia and Herzegovina
Football clubs in Republika Srpska
Derventa
Association football clubs established in 1919
1919 establishments in Bosnia and Herzegovina